Lazar Mijušković (24 December 1867 – 29 September 1936) was a Montenegrin politician and diplomat.

Biography
Mijušković was born on 24 December 1867 in the village of Povija in Pješivci, in the Principality of Montenegro. He obtained a degree as a mining engineer in Paris, France.

He performed the duty of Minister of Finance in Government of Kingdom of Montenegro from June 1903 to December 1905. He also served two terms as the President of the Ministerial Council (Prime Minister of Montenegro).

Mijušković was leader and one of the founders of the True People's Party, founded in 1907.

From 13 October 1913 to 1915 Mijušković was appointed as the ambassador of Montenegro in Belgrade.

See also
 True People's Party

External links

References

1867 births
1936 deaths
Politicians from Nikšić
People of the Principality of Montenegro
People of the Kingdom of Montenegro
Montenegrin nationalists
Prime Ministers of Montenegro
Finance ministers of Montenegro
Diplomats from Nikšić